Clinidium erwini is a species of ground beetle in the subfamily Rhysodinae. It was described by Ross Bell & J.R. Bell in 2009 and named after entomologist Terry Erwin.

Clinidium erwini males measure  and females  in length.

References

Clinidium
Beetles of Central America
Endemic fauna of Costa Rica
Beetles described in 2009